Evan Geiselman (born August 31, 1993 in New Smyrna Beach, Florida) has been a competing surfer since the age of seven. He has won 12 East Coast Championship titles. He is the younger brother of professional surfer Eric Geiselman. He has been trying to be part of the ASP World Championship Tour for three years now, but the Qualification Series are competitive. He didn't get the results he was hoping for on the 2014 WQS. At the beginning of 2014, he moved from San Clemente, California back home, to New Smyrna Beach, Florida.

In March 2008, Geiselman started competing in surf competitions at the NSSA East Coast Nationals at Florida's Sebastian Inlet, leaving with victories in Open Juniors, Open Airshow and Explorer Boys. He also took the highest single-wave score in the Open Juniors division. His other interests besides surfing include hunting and fishing.

He won the US Open Pro Jr. on a stock board.

Geiselman starred in the Luke Bryan music video for the single "Roller Coaster". He was chosen for this role because he was into hunting and surfing, and Luke liked the fact that he was not only a successful surfer but also a country boy. Also starring with him in the video is his current girlfriend.

In December 2015, Geiselman was involved in an accident while surfing the Banzai Pipeline on O'ahu's North Shore and nearly died. He was rescued by a bodyboarder and then by lifeguards. He was rushed to a hospital and has since made full recovery.

References

1993 births
Living people
American surfers